The V-League is a collegiate volleyball league for both men and women in the Philippines organized by Sports Vision.

History

Precursor league

The V-League launched in 2022 traces its roots to the Premier Volleyball League established in 2004 as the Shakey's V-League by Sports Vision Management Group, Inc.. The Shakey's V-League was initially an inter-collegiate women's league with teams from the UAAP, NCAA, CESAFI among others playing in the league. The league had Shakey's Pizza as its title sponsor since its inception until 2016. The league would include corporate and non-collegiate teams in 2011. 

In 2014, a men's division was introduced during its 21st conference. The following year, the men's tournament was spun-off as Spikers' Turf. 

In late-2016, Sports Vision announced that the Spikers' Turf would be merged back with the Shakey's V-League (which was renamed as the Premier Volleyball League). The men's division in the PVL ended with the 2018 PVL Collegiate Conference as its final tournament. The Spikers' Turf was revived on October 6, 2018 and was reestablished as a separate legal entity from  the PVL.

Launch and inaugural season
The PVL became a professional league starting the 2021 season which meant collegiate and amateur teams can no longer take part. Hence in October 2022, Sports Vision relaunched the collegiate conferences of the PVL and Spikers' Turf as a separate league – the V-League. Twelve teams are set to compete in the men's division and eight teams in the women's tournament.

Teams
Men's

Women's

Result summary

Media coverage
The V-League games are streamed live on their official website and Facebook page and on-air thru television via CNN Philippines (starting November 6).

See also 
Shakey's Super League
Spikers' Turf
Premier Volleyball League
NCAA Volleyball Championship (Philippines)
UAAP Volleyball Championship

References

College men's volleyball in the Philippines
Volleyball competitions in the Philippines
Sports leagues established in 2022
2022 establishments in the Philippines
College women's volleyball tournaments in the Philippines